Recophora hreblayi is a moth of the family Noctuidae which is endemic to Turkey.

External links
Species info

Cuculliinae
Endemic fauna of Turkey
Moths described in 2002
Moths of Asia